Xu Ruoya (born ) is a Chinese female volleyball player. She is part of the China women's national volleyball team.

She participated in the 2011 FIVB Volleyball Girls' U18 World Championship, the 2017 Montreux Volley Masters.
On club level she played for Shandong in 2017.

References

External links 
FIVB profile
 https://www.jqknews.com/news/44844-The_Asian_Cup_Jiangsu_womens_volleyball_team_won_the_5_Battle_of_the_third_runner_up_Zhang_Changning_and_Gong_Xiangyu_only_2_wins.html

1994 births
Living people
Chinese women's volleyball players
Opposite hitters
Outside hitters
21st-century Chinese women